Hidden Terrors: The Truth About U.S. Police Operations in Latin America is a 1978 book about American foreign policy in Brazil and Uruguay in the 1960s and early 1970s by the journalist A. J. Langguth.

See also 
History of Uruguay
History of Brazil (1964-1985)
Office of Public Safety (OPS)
Lincoln Gordon

References

External links
Open Library Book Listing: 

1978 non-fiction books
American political books
Books about the Cold War
Books about foreign relations of the United States
Books about Brazil
Pantheon Books books